PFC Kuban Krasnodar (Known as FC Urozhay from 2018 to 2020) is a Russian football team based in Krasnodar. It was founded on 4 June 2018. For the 2021–22 season, it was promoted to the second-tier Russian First League. 

The club is colloquially seen by some to be the successor to FC Kuban Krasnodar, which dissolved in 2018 before being restarted at a regional level, although it is legally not permitted to claim its heritage.

History 
Private limited company Football Club Urozhay was officially registered on 4 June 2018. Originally it was to be named Ekaterinodar, but eventually, for unknown reasons, the Club was named Urozhay. According to the results of the local web portal's Yuga.ru poll about the team's name that was held from 5 to 14 June, the poll option Urozhay took the last place. On 22 June 2018 FC Urozhay received a license for participating in the third-tier Russian Professional Football League in the 2018–19 Russian Professional Football League.

In July 2020 the club was renamed to PFC Kuban. On 24 July 2020, Russian Football Union approved the change of name, with the condition that the club is not the legal successor to former FC Kuban and cannot claim their sporting history.

On 15 June 2021, the club secured the first place in their PFL zone and promotion to Russian Football National League.

Coaching staff

Current squad
As of 22 February 2023, according to the First League website.

Out on loan

References

External links
  

Football clubs in Krasnodar
Association football clubs established in 2018
2018 establishments in Russia